Your Name Engraved Herein is a 2020 Taiwanese romantic drama directed by Patrick Kuang-Hui Liu and starring Edward Chen, Jing-Hua Tseng and Leon Dai. The film premiered in Taiwan on September 30, followed by a global release on Netflix on December 23. Your Name Engraved Herein is the highest-grossing LGBT film in Taiwan's history, as well as the most popular Taiwanese film of 2020, ultimately becoming the first gay-themed movie to exceed NT$100 million at the Taiwanese box office.

The film received five Golden Horse Award nominations, winning for Best Cinematography and Best Original Film Song.

Synopsis 
As martial law ends in 1987 in Taiwan, two male students, Chang Jia-han (A-han) and Wang Bo Te (Birdy), fall in love amid family pressure, homophobia, and broader social change. A new student, Birdy, arrives at an all-boys Catholic high school, where he and A-han soon become best friends; both are musicians in the school band, where they engage in antics while exchanging long glances. The school's priest and band leader, Father Oliver, reminds the students to “profiter du moment” (live in the moment), leading A-han to deepen his bond with Birdy. The two boys take a trip to Taipei—ostensibly to mourn the death of President Chiang Ching-kuo—and grow closer through their adventures in the capital. Despite mutual interest, the pair remain hesitant to act on their budding attraction. The introduction of co-educational schooling adds a wrinkle to their relationship, as the arrival of female students irrevocably transforms classroom dynamics. Birdy catches the eye of a female classmate, who offers the hope of socially-acceptable heterosexual romance, but A-han holds onto his affection for Birdy. Repeated incidents of conflict and reconciliation draw the pair together and break them apart, before fate finally takes them in different directions.

Plot 
The film opens up with the protagonist Chang Jia-han (Edward Chen), also known as A-han, meeting his school priest and band leader Father Oliver (Fabio Grangeon) to discuss the fight he had just gotten into. Father Oliver assumes the fight was over a girl that A-han likes; A-han does not respond, glancing at Father Oliver in silence.

Taking place in Taiwan as martial law ends in 1987, Wang Po Te (Tseng Jing-Hua), known as Birdy, transfers to the same all-boys Catholic high school as A-han. Their first encounter takes place during a training session in the pool where they tell each other what classes they are in. As they test their lung capacity by holding their breath underwater, A-han secretly glances at Birdy, indicating his interest in him.

Birdy is seen sneaking into A-han's room to ask him for soap. Meanwhile, A-han and his other friends get ready to sneak out of the dorms. As they are about to jump the wall Birdy returns from outside, coming back after buying food and scaring the group of boys. A-han and his friends end up in a cemetery where they play band songs for a group of girls they intend to hook up with. All of A-han's friends have already begun hooking up while he is sitting there alone. He is suddenly approached by one of the girls, who puts his hand on her breast. She then proceeds to sit on him in an attempt to seduce him. Disappointed at his inability to get an erection, A-han apologizes to her.

Another day in band class, Father Oliver gives a lesson to the students to live in the moment (“profiter du moment”) and discusses the concept of youth and love with the class. The class asks Father Oliver of his first love and as the story is being told, Birdy and A-han exchange glances and smiles at each other.

In the evening, Birdy is caught by the dorm head sneaking out for food and disciplined with corporal punishment. A-han goes to the showers to give Birdy ointment for his wounds. As A-han waits for Birdy to finish showering, A-han's friend Horn and his groupies are shown bullying and assaulting a homosexual student. A-han and Birdy are hiding in the shower stall together but as soon as the bullies take off the boy's pants and try to put a lighter to his genitals, A-han runs out of the stall to stop the boys. They try to peer-pressure A-han into beating the boy because of his homosexuality and explain that sinners must be punished. Just as A-han freezes, Birdy steps out of the stall, helps the victim up and both walk away. Horn asks A-han if him and Birdy were in the same stall but he brushes it off after A-han denies this. The same night, Birdy sneaks into A-han's bed, where he shares snacks stolen from the dorm head's office.

After the death of president Chiang Ching-kuo is announced, the two travel to Taipei to mourn on behalf of their school. They grow closer through their adventures in the capital. While in Taipei, Birdy and A-han see a protester (Chi Chia-wei) on a footbridge, holding a sign saying “Homosexuality is not a disease!”. Police violently detain the protester, while A-han restrains an outraged Birdy and prevents him from intervening. At a video-salon room while the movie Birdy is playing on the TV screen, A-han leans in to kiss Birdy as he sleeps but is interrupted by room service who tells him not to fool around. They spend intimate moments and have deep conversations throughout their trip but never act on their attraction.

The summer following their trip, A-han remains melancholic due to conflicting thoughts about his identity and feelings. He asks his parents to buy him a scooter, which creates tension with his father. A-han waits by the phone until he receives a call from Birdy. After meeting up, the two boys ride on A-han's new scooter his mother buys for him to cheer him up. The pair watch films together at the cinema and steal movie posters from the wall. They sneak into a projection room where Birdy voices his desire to become a filmmaker, asking A-han to go to film school with him in Taipei. They are discovered by the cinema owner and chased out of the room. The next morning, A-han has a wet dream of Birdy.

In the following semester back to school, the introduction of a co-educational policy adds a wrinkle as the presence of female students irrevocably changes school dynamics. Despite allowing the matriculation of girls, school officials are still strict on intermingling between the sexes. In band class, a school disciplinary official gets into an argument about keeping girls and boys separated. A female student, Wu Ruo-fei (known as Ban-Ban), stands up for herself after the official berates her. Birdy also chimes in, sparking a growing interest between the pair.

Along with increasing homophobic accusations and humiliation after performing an effeminate song at a military song competition, Birdy seeks comfort in the arms of Ban-Ban and the reassurance and stability she provides to him in relation to heterosexual norms. As Birdy and Ban-Ban begin to spend more time together, A-han starts to become increasingly jealous and helpless. A-han enters a chapel and prays for clarity; Birdy walks in and taunts him for his lack of a girlfriend and offers to introduce him to someone. A-han becomes furious at Birdy's nonchalant attitude and accuses him of toying with his feelings. Birdy asks if A-han can stop trying to hang out with him alone. A-han then goes out with a girl he previously met with and she tells him a way to profess love over a pager. A-han immediately sends this message to Birdy, but does not receive a response as Birdy is out with Ban-Ban.

At night, A-han helps Birdy steal a giant balloon for a surprise prank. The next morning, the surprise turns out to be a love confession to Ban-Ban from Birdy which upsets A-han. Leaving for some solace, A-han meets an older man who tries to comfort him. When the old man makes a sexual advance, A-han pushes him away and leaves. The scene cuts back to A-han's conversation with Father Oliver where the protagonist says he would rather go to hell. He says that if all gay people go to hell, then more people might understand him there.

A-han finds Birdy after he has gotten into an accident and wrecked the scooter. Birdy insists he will fix the scooter but A-han says not to worry. Back at the dorms, A-han helps Birdy shower due to his injury. They soon become intimate, and A-han begins to give Birdy a handjob. Birdy resists but then gives in to his desire. As Birdy climaxes he kisses A-han, but then apologizes. The pair cry and embrace while sharing an intimate moment filled with conflicting emotions of love, pain, shame, and desire.

Soon after, Birdy begins to ignore and avoid A-han, confusing him. It is also revealed that Ban-Ban has been expelled from the school with Birdy only being given detention because of the balloon incident. Birdy's father arrives at the school and proceeds to beat him for being disobedient and not focusing on education. A-han tries to stop Birdy from getting hit. The two boys begin fighting with each other. The fight gets broken up by the teachers and Father Oliver. Reconnecting back to the present in the conversation between A-han and Father Oliver, Father Oliver talks about his youth and how he used to rebel but tried to stay on path. He then offers to pray for A-han which is interrupted by Horn, who tells A-han to go home. A-han refuses, but Horn tells him that Birdy is there, so A-han immediately runs out of the room to go home and see Birdy.

When A-han reaches home, his parents tell him not to fight with his best friend over a girl but A-han is frustrated that he cannot say the truth. After a heated argument with Birdy in which he almost comes out to his parents, A-han runs away from home with Birdy following him. They arrive at an island in Penghu where A-han tries to take out his frustrations by screaming, only to be calmed down by Birdy. They have intimate conversations and go skinny dipping. Laying naked on the beach together, A-han touches Birdy softly then kisses him which Birdy reciprocates. The pair do not see each other again after that. Birdy moves away to focus on his university entrance exams and A-han calls him one last time to confess his love for him by playing him a song (Your Name Engraved Herein theme song by Crowd Lu). The pair both break down and sob longingly due to heartbreak.

Many years later at the school's marching band reunion, a middle-aged A-han attends in hopes of meeting Birdy again, without success. A-han then reconnects with Ban-Ban, who is now Birdy's ex-wife and mother of his children. A-han asks how Birdy is to which Ban-Ban responds that they rarely see each other. Ban-Ban notes that Birdy's stubbornness to keep his secret has ruined everyone's lives while wishing Birdy told her earlier on, and remarks that men loving men is innate. A-han later travels to Canada to pay respects at Father Oliver's grave and meets with Father Oliver's former lover. He tells A-han about Father Oliver's struggle to accept his identity as a homosexual man and how he turned to religion to suppress his desires. A-han is still distraught about him being unable to meet with Birdy, only for them to run into each other outside a bar where they reminisce about their love, struggles and relationship. Birdy finally admits that he really loved A-han then and was just unable to accept it himself. As they arrive to A-han's accommodation, he offers Birdy to come inside for a drink to which Birdy declines but accepts an offer to walk together back to his hotel. As they walk together, a younger version of A-han begins singing Your Name Engraved Herein to which younger Birdy joins in. The film ends off with the older pair watching their younger selves singing with each other and skipping through the alley together.

Cast 

 Edward Chen Hao-Sen (陳昊森) as Chang Jia-han (張家漢) nicknamed "A-Han" (阿漢)
 Leon Dai (戴立忍) as a middle-aged Chang Jia-han
 Jing-Hua Tseng (曾敬驊) as Wang Po Te (王柏德) nicknamed "Birdy"
 Jason Wang (王識賢) as a middle-aged Birdy
 Fabio Grangeon (法比歐) as Father Oliver
 Mimi Shao (邵奕玫) as Wu Ruo-fei (吳若非), nicknamed Ban-Ban (班班)
 Waa Wei (魏如萱) as a middle-aged Ban-Ban

Trivia 

The film opens with a line from Song of Solomon 8:7 “Many waters cannot quench love, neither can the floods drown it”, presaging the tension between the protagonist's Catholic faith and his love for a fellow male student.

A homage to noted Taiwanese gay rights activist Chi Chia-wei appears in the film. While in Taipei, Birdy and A-Han see a protester on an overhead bridge, holding a sign that declares, “Homosexuality is not a disease!” Police violently detain the protester, while A-Han restrains an outraged Birdy and prevents him from intervening. The outfit, sign and protest location reflect Chi's real-life demonstrations.

The theme song Your Name Engraved Herein, performed by singer Crowd Lu and lead actor Edward Chen, was composed by Malaysian songwriters Keon Chia (Chia Wang) and Dr. Hooi Yuan Teng (Hsu Yuan-Ting), and Singaporean lawyer Tan Boon Wah (Chen Wen-Hua). The piece won Best Original Film Song at Taiwan's Golden Horse Film Festival and Awards, the Oscars of the Chinese-speaking world. As of December 2020, the music video has garnered more than 22 million views on YouTube.

This film's scene was based in Viator catholic high school, Taichung.

Release and reception 
Your Name Engraved Herein is the highest-grossing LGBT film in Taiwan's history, as well as the most popular Taiwanese film of 2020, ultimately becoming the first gay-themed movie to exceed NT$100 million at the Taiwanese box office.

The film received five Golden Horse Award nominations, winning for Best Cinematography and Best Original Film Song.

Teo Bugbee of The New York Times reviewed the film, stating, "The director, Patrick Liu, has an eye for the way that physical desire manifests itself: the gestures of affection, the postures of people pretending not to acknowledge each other. He doesn’t rush the romance between the boys, and his patience allows the actors to develop believable chemistry. Though the movie could coast on the appeal of handsome faces and stolen trips to Taipei, Liu gives texture to their pretty pining."

Writing in Yahoo Lifestyle SEA, Teng Yong Ping suggests the "touching telephone call scene where Jia-han plays a love song he wrote for Birdy (the award-winning theme song) would likely turn on the waterworks for many viewers." However, Teng finds that the "heartfelt romantic storyline" is confused when "the last act of the film inexplicably fast-forwards the timeline by 30 years and transports the characters, now adult and played by Leon Dai and Jason Wang, to a current-day setting in Quebec City on the pretext of them attending the funeral of their former teacher, Father Oliver. This odd screenplay choice could be due to the film being partly funded by the Canadian government."

Awards

References

External links
 
 

2020 LGBT-related films
LGBT-related romantic drama films
Taiwanese LGBT-related films
2020 romantic drama films
Gay-related films